Miranda Merron is a British female sailor born on 2 July 1969. She is an offshore sailor having extensively competed with highlights including a Jules Verne Trophy attempt with Tracey Edwards on Royal Sunalliance and the completing the 2020–2021 Vendée Globe.

Biography
Her family introduced her to sailing at an early age crewing for her father on his International 14 dinghy, at the age of nine she crossed the Atlantic with her father. Growing up, she studied (Oriental Studies/ Japanese) at Cambridge University and began her professional career in advertising all over the world.

With 12 years experience in the Class 40 with partner Halvard Mabire who was instrumental to her Vendee Globe dream as she originally intended todo a Class 40 round the world race. However the increased safety of a 60 ft boat and an organised race made here shift her goals.

Now she lives splits her time between Hamble le Rice in the Great Britain and France with her partner and fellow offshore sailor Halvard Mabire in Barneville-Carteret France.

Race results

References

External links
 Campaign Website

1969 births
Living people
Alumni of the University of Cambridge
British female sailors (sport)
Class 40 class sailors
IMOCA 60 class sailors
Volvo Ocean Race sailors
British Vendee Globe sailors
2020 Vendee Globe sailors
Vendée Globe finishers
Single-handed circumnavigating sailors